La vacanza ( Italian: The vacation) is a 1971 Italian drama film by Tinto Brass. It stars Vanessa Redgrave and Franco Nero. It premiered at the Venice Film Festival on 4 September 1971 where it was awarded the 'Best Italian Film' prize. This was followed by a theatrical release in Italy on 5 April 1972. A year earlier, Brass, Redgrave and Nero had worked together on the romantic drama, Dropout.

Plot
Immacolata (Redgrave) is a peasant girl and mistress of the count, but when he turns his attentions back to his wife he has Immacolata committed to a mental asylum. 'La Vacanza' is her one-month experimental leave from the institution. She is rejected by her family and subsequently finds new friends in the form of gypsies and an Englishman. But their happiness is blighted by criminal actions and a fight for freedom.

Cast
Vanessa Redgrave as Immacolata Meneghelli
Franco Nero as Osiride
Leopoldo Trieste as Judge
Corin Redgrave as Gigi
Countessa Veronica as Iside
Germana Monteverdi Mercedes as The Countess
Margarita Lozano as Ra
Fany Sakantany as Alpi
Pupo De Luca 
Attilio Corsini
Osiride Pevarello as Olindo

References

External links
 Tinto Brass
 

1971 films
1970s Italian-language films
English-language Italian films
1970s English-language films
Films directed by Tinto Brass
Italian drama films
1971 drama films
Films shot in Veneto
Films about psychiatry
1971 multilingual films
Italian multilingual films
1970s Italian films